Batu was a federal constituency in Selangor, Malaysia, that was represented in the Dewan Rakyat from 1959 to 1974.

The federal constituency was created in the 1958 redistribution and was mandated to return a single member to the Dewan Rakyat under the first past the post voting system.

History

Representation history

State constituency

Election results

References

Defunct Selangor federal constituencies